Edgeworth Blair "Elliott" Reid (January 16, 1920 – June 21, 2013) was an American actor.

Early life
Reid was born in Manhattan, the son of artist Christine Challenger Reid and banker Blair Reid. He attended the Professional Children's School.

Radio
In 1935, Reid debuted on the radio program The March of Time, which led to regular work on radio dramas during the golden age of radio. He portrayed Melvin Castleberry on the children's program Billy and Betty, and Philip Cameron on the serial Against the Storm and was a host on radio's version of The United States Steel Hour. Early on he took "Elliott" as his stage name. His credits include many Orson Welles-directed stage and radio productions, such as The Mercury Theatre on the Air. He also acted on  Theatre Guild on the Air, The Adventures of Philip Marlowe, Suspense, and the CBS Radio Mystery Theater. In some early performances he was credited as "Ted Reid".

Film

Reid's best-known film role was as Ernie Malone, private detective hired to spy on Marilyn Monroe's character, only to become Jane Russell's love interest, in the 20th Century Fox classic Gentlemen Prefer Blondes (1953). Variety praised his and Tommy Noonan's performances, saying that "Reid and Noonan carry off the romantic male spots nicely".

Reid played the snide Professor Shelby Ashton of Rutland University (the rival of perennial underdog Medfield College) in two Walt Disney movies starring Fred MacMurray: The Absent-Minded Professor in 1961, and its sequel Son of Flubber in 1963. Also in 1963, Reid appeared in the comedy The Wheeler Dealers starring James Garner and Lee Remick, with Pat Crowley in a supporting role. Reid portrayed Ralph Hastings in Disney's 1966 movie Follow Me, Boys! and a television commentator in Disney's Blackbeard's Ghost in 1968.

Television
A member of The Actors Studio from its inception, Reid was a regular in NBC television's That Was the Week That Was (1964–1965). Although he was signed to be the series's anchor-host, his role was reduced. He portrayed Warren Winslow on the CBS comedy Miss Winslow and Son (1979). He also made guest appearances on Murder, She Wrote, The Odd Couple, I Love Lucy, It's Always Jan, Barney Miller, Small Wonder, Perry Mason, and The Munsters.

In 1992 Reid appeared in the season three Seinfeld episode "The Letter", as one of the collectors considering buying a painting of Kramer. Reid's final television role was as Henry on the episode "Please Re-Lease Me" of the television sitcom Maybe This Time. He retired in 1995, but returned for an uncredited role as Miguel in the 2000 short film Scattering Mother and the role of Buddy in the feature film adaptation of the same name in 2005.

Impressions
Among his special skills, Elliot Reid was also an accomplished impressionist. He was so famous with his John F. Kennedy impersonation that, in 1962, he was invited to perform it in front of Kennedy in person; Kennedy was happy with the performance. One reference book said, "His mimicking of John F. Kennedy opened up a mini-career in clubs in the early 1960s."

Stage
Reid's Broadway credits include Julius Caesar (1937–1938), The Shoemaker's Holiday (1938), Macbeth (1948), Two Blind Mice (1949), The Live Wire (1950), Two on the Aisle (1951–1952), and From A to Z (1960).

He co-starred as Felix Unger in a road production of The Odd Couple with Dan Dailey as Oscar Madison during the late 1960s.

Death
Reid died of heart failure on June 21, 2013, at age 93. His nephew stated that Reid had been residing in an assisted living facility in Studio City, California, for several years prior to his death. His remains were cremated and his ashes were scattered in the Pacific Ocean.

Selected filmography

 The Ramparts We Watch (1940) – Ralph Gilchrist
 Young Ideas (1943) – Jeff Evans
 The Story of Dr. Wassell (1944) – William 'Andy' Anderson
 A Double Life (1947) – Actor in 'A Gentleman's Gentleman'
 Sierra (1950) – Duke Lafferty
 The Whip Hand (1951) – Matt Corbin
 Gentlemen Prefer Blondes (1953) – Ernie Malone
 Vicki (1953) – Steve Christopher
 Woman's World (1954) – Tony Andrews
 Inherit the Wind (1960) – Prosecutor Tom Davenport
 The Absent-Minded Professor (1961) – Professor Shelby Ashton
 Son of Flubber  (1963) – Prof. Shelby Ashton
 The Thrill of It All (1963) – Mike Palmer
 It's a Mad, Mad, Mad, Mad World (1963) – Dr. Chadwick (voice, uncredited)
 The Wheeler Dealers (1963) – Leonard
 Move Over, Darling  (1963) – Dr. Herman Schlick
 Who's Been Sleeping in My Bed? (1963) – Tom Edwards
 Follow Me, Boys! (1966) – Ralph Hastings
 Blackbeard's Ghost (1968) – TV Commentator
 Some Kind of a Nut (1969) – Gardner Anderson
 Heaven Can Wait (1978) – Waiter (uncredited)
 Young Einstein'' (1988) – Asylum Guard

References

External links

1920 births
2013 deaths
Male actors from New York City
American male film actors
American male stage actors
American male television actors
American male radio actors
20th-century American male actors
People from Studio City, Los Angeles